Gwendoline Gendarme (born 18 March 1991) is a French ice hockey player for Djurgårdens IF Hockey and the French national team.

She represented France at the 2019 IIHF Women's World Championship.

References

External links

1991 births
Living people
French expatriate ice hockey people
French expatriate sportspeople in Sweden
French expatriate sportspeople in Switzerland
French women's ice hockey defencemen
People from Rosny-sous-Bois
Djurgårdens IF Hockey Dam players